Indium(III) selenide is a compound of indium and selenium. It has potential for use in photovoltaic devices and it has been the subject of extensive research. The two most common phases, α and β, have a layered structure, while γ is a "defect wurtzite structure." In all, there are five known forms (α, β, γ, δ, κ). The α- β phase transition is accompanied by a change in electrical conductivity. The band-gap of γ-In2Se3 is approximately 1.9 eV.
The crystalline form of a sample can depend on the method of production, for example thin films of pure γ-In2Se3 have been produced from trimethylindium, InMe3, and hydrogen selenide, H2Se, using MOCVD techniques. Indium selenide has been shown to have excellent electronic properties in its two-dimensional (few-layer) form. Because of its air sensitivity, several processes have been developed to encapsulate the material for the integration in electronic devices.

See also
Gallium(III) selenide
Indium chalcogenides
Nanoparticle

General references
 WebElements

Footnotes

External links
 Indium Selenide Nanoparticles Used In Solar Energy Conversion.

Indium compounds
Selenides
Solar cells
Semiconductor materials